The 2015–16 NBB Cup was the 48th edition of the Netherlands national basketball cup tournament. SPM Shoeters Den Bosch won its 7th national cup title after beating ZZ Leiden in the Final. The Final was played on 27 March 2016 in the Landstede Sportcentrum in Zwolle.

Format
In the first, second and third round teams from the Dutch second, third and fourth division participate. From the fourth round, teams from the Dutch Basketball League (DBL) enter the competition. Quarter- and semi-finals are played in a two-legged format. When a team form a tier lower than the DBL played a DBL team, one win is sufficient for the latter to advance to the next round.

Bracket

Fourth round

|}

Quarterfinals

|}

Semifinals

|}

Final

References

NBB Cup
NBB Cup